Naked Boys Singing! is a musical revue that features traditional American vaudeville-style music performed by eight actors who sing and dance naked. The campy musical comedy premiered at the Celebration Theatre in West Hollywood, California, on March 28, 1998. The show opened off-Broadway in July 1999, and was subsequently transferred numerous times across New York City. A Las Vegas production at the Erotic Heritage Museum opened in September 2021.

Productions
The show opened off-Broadway at the Actors' Playhouse on July 22, 1999, with book and direction by Robert Schrock, musical direction by Stephen Bates, and choreography by Jeffry Denman, originally produced by Jamie Cesa, Jennifer Dumas, Hugh Hayes, Tom Smedes, and Carl D. White.

The show transferred to Theatre Four in March 2004, and gained attention when producers offered discounts to those attending the 2004 Republican National Convention. The show transferred again in 2005 to New World Stages Stage Four, until closing on January 28, 2012. 

Productions of Naked Boys Singing! have been performed throughout the United States, with international shows in Norway, Puerto Rico, Brazil, Japan, Italy, South Africa, and Australia.

Shortly after the original off-Broadway production closed, Producer/Directors Tom and Michael D'Angora decided to transfer their Provincetown adaption of Naked Boys Singing! to the off-Broadway stage, with a revival at Theatre Row's Kirk Theatre on April 5, 2012. 

A production at the Erotic Heritage Museum in Las Vegas opened in September 2021.

Synopsis

The show has no plot; it contains 15 songs, about various issues, such as gay life, male nudity, coming out, circumcision and love.

Musical numbers

Cast

Awards and nominations
 2010 Broadway.com Audience Award nomination: Favorite Long-Running Off-Broadway Show
 2011 Off-Broadway Alliance nomination: Best Long-Running Show
 2021 BroadwayWorld winner: Best Las Vegas Musical

Film adaptation

The show was adapted into a film of the same name, released in 2007.

Cast and songs
Kevin Alexander Stea – Naked Maid
Joe Souza – Bliss of a Bris
Phong Truong (also called Ethan Le Phong) – Window to the Soul
Jason Currie – Entertainer
Joseph Keane – Perky Little Porn Star
Anthony Manough – Muscle Addiction
Andrew Blake Ames – Jack's Song
Vincent Zamora – Window to Window
Jaymes Hodges – Nothin' but the Radio On
Salvatore Vassallo – Conductor

References

External links
 Naked Boys Singing! Las Vegas
 
 
 
 

1999 musicals
Off-Broadway musicals
Original musicals
Nudity in theatre and dance
LGBT-related musicals
American plays adapted into films